The Glow of Love is the debut studio album by Italian/American ensemble Change, released in April 1980. It includes the singles "A Lover's Holiday", "Searching" and "The Glow of Love"; all three singles simultaneously topped the US dance chart for nine weeks from May to June 1980. The album reached number twenty-nine on the US Billboard Album Chart and ten on the US Billboard Black Albums chart.

Background
The band recorded the songs for the album at Fonoprint Studios in Bologna, Italy. The songs were then taken to Power Station Studios in New York City for the recording of the vocals. "Searching" and the title track were recorded and mixed at Mediasound Studios in New York. The sessions were then mastered at Sterling Sound Studios.

The artwork was designed and illustrated by Greg Porto.

Reception

The Glow of Love received positive reviews from the majority of critics. Alex Henderson writing retrospectively for AllMusic describes it as a disco/R&B masterpiece and Change's most essential album. Nile Rodgers and Bernard Edwards' Chic sound is noted as a heavy influence but Henderson argues that "knowledgeable disco and R&B enthusiasts knew better; Change wasn't a carbon copy of Chic any more than jazz great Chet Baker was a clone of Miles Davis." "A Lover's Holiday" is marked as a playful opener, while "It's a Girl's Affair" and "Angel in My Pocket" are highlighted as "sassy and passionate," respectively.

Robert Christgau writing at the time, summarises the album as "New and true and gay" and "having the complete bag of disco tricks." The influence of Chic is again noted in "A Lover's Holiday" which he describes as a "Rodgers-&-Edwards rip." He also compares "The End" to the electronic music of Giorgio Moroder.

The album's showcasing of Luther Vandross is highlighted in most reviews. Ed Hogan, writing for AllMusic, described "The Glow of Love" as a startling introduction to Vandross' dazzling singing style. Henderson remarks that "the laid-back title song which Vandross sang on became a quiet storm radio favorite and demonstrates that not everything Change recorded was aimed at the dancefloor. Vandross had yet to secure a solo career in 1980, although many of the people who heard his performances on those two gems agreed that a solo career was inevitable."

Use in other media
 English alternative rock band Happy Mondays sampled "A Lover's Holiday" for their song "Holiday" in their 1990 album Pills 'n' Thrills and Bellyaches.
 Billy Lawrence sampled "The Glow of Love" in her 1997 song "Up & Down"
 Aretha Franklin also sampled the song in her song "Here We Go Again" from her 1998 album, A Rose Is Still a Rose.
 Phats & Small also sampled it in their 1999 song "Turn Around".
 Swedish group Alcazar sampled “The Glow of Love” in their 2000 song “Paris in the Rain”.
 Janet Jackson sampled "The Glow of Love" in her 2001 song "All for You".  The song was co-written and co-produced by long-time collaborators Jimmy Jam & Terry Lewis, who would produce four songs for Change's 1984 album Change of Heart. 
 Suga Free and Kokane sampled the song "A Lover's Holiday" in their 2021 single "SugaKane".

Track listing

Personnel
 David Romani and Paolo Gianolio – composing, arrangement, conductor
 David Romani and Mauro Malavasi – composing, arrangement ("The Glow of Love")
 Mauro Malavasi – composing, arrangement ("Searching")
 Wayne Garfield, Paul Slade, Tanyayette Willoughby – lyrics
 Jacques Fred Petrus – producer, executive producer (for Little Macho Music Co., Inc., New York)
 Mauro Malavasi – executive producer (for Little Macho Music Co., Inc., New York)
 All songs featuring instruments played by the Good Music Orchestra
 Luther Vandross – lead vocals ("The Glow of Love" and "Searching")
 Jocelyn Brown – lead vocals ("Angel In My Pocket" and "It's a Girl's Affair")
 Maurizio Biancani – engineering (Fonoprint Studios)
 Bill Scheniman – engineering (Power Station Studios)
 Michael Brauer – engineering (Mediasound Studios)
 Ray Caviano and Bob Siegel – album coordination
 Greg Porto – album design and illustration
Recorded at Fonoprint Studios, Bologna, Italy. All vocals were recorded and mixed at Power Station Studios, New York City. "The Glow of Love" and "Searching" were recorded and mixed at Mediasound Studios, New York City. Mastered at Sterling Sound Inc., New York City.

Charts

References

1980 debut albums
Change (band) albums
Warner Records albums